Albert "Alby" Grant, played by Matt Ross, is a fictional character from the HBO series Big Love.  The character is loosely based on the real life polygamist leader Warren Jeffs.

Overview
The character of Alby Grant was first introduced in the show's pilot episode. He is a hard-line member of the fictional polygamist group United Effort Brotherhood (UEB) and is one of the many sons of Roman Grant (Harry Dean Stanton), the "Prophet" of the organization. His mother is Roman's sixth wife, Adaleen (Mary Kay Place), and Nicki (Chloë Sevigny), Bill Henrickson's second wife, is his sister. Tall and slender, Alby has a pale, smooth-featured face, sleek brown hair, and cold brown eyes. Alby, who usually accompanies his aging father on rounds, sees himself as being groomed for the sect's number one position.

Both Roman and Alby dislike protagonist Bill Henrickson (Bill Paxton), whom they view as morally wayward, anti-compound, and disloyal, among other things. Bill is a successful business entrepreneur, owning the popular home improvement warehouse Henrickson's Home Plus. After Bill refuses to give Roman a percentage of his income on his second store, Roman dispatches Alby to help him take care of the situation. Alby engages in many schemes to intimidate Bill, including scaring his kids.

After failing numerous times to persuade Bill to submit to his father's payment demands, Alby loses his father's favor, which results in him taking a sabbatical. During his sabbatical he has an encounter with a street hustler (Kevin Alejandro) at a market, leading the man to believe he was being hired for sex. The man then makes a sexual advance on him, which Alby reluctantly, and dramatically, rejects by shrieking loudly and banging his head against a hotel wall. In the second season, Alby's closeted homosexuality is alluded to again by him checking out the bodies of other men and comments made by his sister Nicki.

During the final episode of the first season his father asks him to find new methods to punish both Bill and his ally brother Joey (Shawn Doyle), who lives on the compound with his wife Wanda (Melora Walters) and their baby. Bill and Joey's interest in a UEB Priesthood seat arouses caution in Roman, who believes Bill is setting up a plot against his interests.  Alby begins his investigation by spooking Wanda by materializing inside her home, looking for Bill and her husband. Wanda tells him that Joey is not home. An impatient Alby snoops around her house and then approaches her newborn child, insinuating that he will do whatever is necessary to persuade her to cooperate. Wanda responds by making a fake phone call to Joey, urging him to come home. She then offers Alby lemonade, which is spiked with anti-freeze; it sends him into a coma and nearly kills him.

The second season shows a fully recovered Alby set for implacable vengeance on those who wronged him, particularly Bill. Although Alby knows that Wanda is responsible for his poisoning, he does little to punish her for reason that he is aware of her mental instability and therefore believes someone must have put her up to the task.  Also, Alby sees the attempt on his life as a political opportunity to rid Juniper Creek of people he dislikes or sees as a threat to him.  Although uncertain as to whether Bill played a role in the attempt on his life, he does, however, believe fully that he is trying to cover up the situation.  Eventually the blame goes to Joey, who takes the blame in order to keep his unstable wife from going to jail- however, it is uncovered that the murder attempt was fully Wanda's doing.  Alby, however, is unsatisfied and wants Bill punished.  Once again, Alby resorts to terror tactics against Bill's family by spooking his daughter Sarah (Amanda Seyfried).  Bill learns of the incident and has a violent confrontation with Alby, bruising him badly.

After his father's assassination attempt, Alby made a power move, and to Bill's horror, successfully maneuvers himself to the sect's number one position. With his bullet-ridden father in the hospital, Alby became the series' primary villain.  During the third season Alby is shown to run the UEB with an iron fist, crushing all dissent with exile and excommunication. One of the main plot lines of the third season revolves around a Mormon document that implies that the LDS Church faked their renouncement of polygamy in order to get Utah formally recognized as a state. Bill acquires the document, hoping that it will set the LDS church straight. This leads to problems in the Henrickson household, culminating in Barbara Henrickson (Jeanne Tripplehorn) being excommunicated from the LDS Church. Hollis Greene (Luke Askew) (the "Prophet" of a rival polygamous group) also wants the document and resorts to kidnapping the adopted daughter of Ted Price (Patrick Fabian) (Bill's brother-in-law; a respected member of the LDS church) to force Bill to give it up. However, upon being given the document, they reveal that it is a forgery and that Alby faked the document in order to con money out of the church.

The situation of Alby's family betrayal and power move causes his mother to put herself in a self-imposed exile, where she hires a contract killer (Dan Lemieux) to assassinate her wayward son. The assassin, pretending to be a man interested in having sex with Alby at a rest area bathroom, fails at his attempt, leaving Alby more paranoid.  Alby finds out about the conspiracy and with his second wife Lura (Anne Dudek) he slowly plots a calculating vengeance.  Lura is Alby's closest confidant and she has considerable influence on his political decisions.  The final episode of third season reveals that he will strike Adaleen with a homemade bomb that he and Lura have been constructing. The bomb, which is concealed in an envelope and designed to detonate the instant the envelope is opened (or stepped on), is placed by Alby outside the hotel room door where Adaleen is staying. Alby becomes scared as he sees a Hispanic housekeeper appear close by doing her rounds. Not wanting any collateral damage Alby shouts quietly "váyase! váyase!" ("Go Away! Go Away!").  The housekeeper proceeds on towards Alby anyway and rolls her cleaning cart over the bomb causing Alby to frantically duck for cover.  The bomb does not yet go off, causing Alby to release his guard just a second or two before the bomb does detonate, hurting both him and the housekeeper, and leaving Adaleen unscathed.

The start of the fourth season shows Alby fully recovered from the explosion.  He learns from Nicki that his father is no more (Roman was murdered by Joey via suffocation at the end of third season).  He and Lura are blissful about the news and make almost no attempt at hiding their feelings from the dismayed Nicki.  Alby, with the help of Lura, quickly makes his move to become the next prophet. Alby makes a calculating move and moves his father's corpse to Idaho to the Hendrickson's newly opened, but still under construction, casino, in the hopes it will ruin his nemesis. When a construction worker (Van Epperson) discovers Roman in a lawn chair, Bill is able to prevent the FBI from finding Roman before he seemingly returns Roman's body to Juniper Creek.

The start of the fourth season also shows Alby having sex with a traveling businessman named Dale Tomasson (Ben Koldyke) whom he meets at a park. Both are stunned when Bill introduces them (Dale is an attorney that has been assigned to be the trustee of the UEB in Roman's "absence").  Alby rejects the trusteeship and accuses Bill of being the mastermind behind Roman's absence and the FBI raids that recently took place at Juniper Creek (They were investigating Roman's disappearance).  It is also revealed that Dale leads a reparative therapy group for homosexuals.  Despite his efforts, Alby is relentless in pursuing Dale for sex and comfort.  It is apparent that the two love each other; they have numerous sexual encounters and it seems that Dale may start to wield influence over Alby's politics, as he suggests him to reform and unify his hard-line church. While dressing, Alby experiences a moment of what appears to be schizophrenia. His father is berating him for his homosexual activity and advises him to commit suicide for the sake of his wives and mother.

In the meantime, Alby forces his mother to marry JJ (Željko Ivanek), Nicki's first husband and father of Nicki's first daughter, Cara Lynn.

The affair with Dale goes on, one day Alby sneaks into Dale's house and surprises him with a gift and home-cooked meal, but when he spies papers about Dale's work with the UEB he sees again Roman Grant insulting him and takes off. He returns later and confronts Dale about cooperating with Bill to break up the compound. Alby defends the Principle and Dale convinces him they can reform, not destroy. Alby seems now to accept his feelings for Dale, considering him the answers to his prayers and starts to live their relationship with much more serenity (he stops seeing his father, he rents an apartment in Salt Lake City) than Dale, who has always struggled consciously against his sexuality. Alby's wife Lura observes Alby's change of attitude and decides to investigate and finds out about his homosexual affair.  Rumors start to spread, and Bill confronts Dale, who admits having seen the de facto Prophet just to convince him to cooperate. When Lura tells Bill that Dale is gay, he confronts him one more time, and this time Bill asks Dale if he's having sex with Alby. He admits it and asks to keep it private. Bill passes no judgment and admits to him that he also struggles with demons.  Unfortunately, Lura tells everything to Dale's wife. Realizing that his life is now destroyed, he kills himself.  Alby shockingly finds Dale's body hanging from the roof beam of their apartment.

During the trial on Dale's death, Alby is questioned about the apartment where the trustee was found; as a matter of fact it had been rented with the U.E.B. funds, and he lies, denying to have anything to do with it. Back to the compound, while he is despairing about his loss, Lura asks forgiveness, without saying for what, and then announces Nicki. Nicki comes in and asks her brother to leave the compound to start a new life, the two seems to connect but suddenly Roman's ghost appears to Alby, pointing out how love only brings sorrow. Alby surrenders to his paranoia and chases Nicki away.

In the fourth and fifth seasons, Alby becomes a fugitive as the FBI indicts him on various crimes, including murder, tax evasion, spousal abuse and arrangements of illegal marriages between his adult male followers and underage girls.

See also
Bill Henrickson
Mormon fundamentalism
Fundamentalist Church of Jesus Christ of Latter Day Saints
Warren Jeffs

References 
Official HBO biography of Alby Grant

Big Love characters
Fictional gay males
Television characters introduced in 2006
Fictional LGBT characters in television